Myobatrachus is a genus of frogs found in Western Australia. It is monotypic, being represented by the single species, Myobatrachus gouldii, also known as the turtle frog.

Habitat

The turtle frog is found in between Geraldton and Fitzgerald River in the Perth region, Western Australia. This area is mainly semi-arid, so the frogs have adapted to suit this region. They have developed short muscular limbs to help them dig into the sand but, unlike most frogs, they dig forward, like a turtle. They feed on termites so the adaptation of the muscular limbs is useful when trying to penetrate a termite mound. They do not need to live near standing pools of water, as they undergo the entire metamorphosis stage within their eggs. Their closest relatives, among the few who share most of the turtle frogs traits, are sandhill frogs and forest toadlets.

Mating

Mating generally occurs recently after it has rained, but their call has been heard during July as well, suggesting variating mating seasons. When a pair of turtle frogs select each other as mates, they retire to the base of their burrow. Burrows may be as much as 1.3 metres deep. Breeding takes place within the burrow several months later. When the females lay eggs, they lay up to 50, and each can measure 7.5 mm in diameter.

References

External links 
 
 

Myobatrachidae
Amphibians of Western Australia
Amphibians described in 1841
Frogs of Australia
Monotypic amphibian genera
Endemic fauna of Southwest Australia